The Bayu-Undan to Darwin Pipeline, also known as the Bayu-Undan Gas Export Pipeline or Gas Export Pipeline (GEP), is a multi-diameter subsea gas export pipeline which transports dry gas from the Bayu-Undan field in the Timor Sea to the Darwin LNG plant at Wickham Point, near Darwin, Northern Territory.

History 
Originally Phillips Petroleum Company had plans to design and build a dry gas export pipeline from Bayu-Undan to Timor-Leste. But in June 2001 it decided to send the gas to Darwin after failing to reach an agreement about fiscal, legal and tax arrangements with the East Timorese government. 

The Gas Export Pipeline (GEP) formed part of Phase 2 of the Bayu-Undan Development project. For the first time in 2006 compressed dry gas was exported from the CPP through the subsea pipeline to Australia, where it was liquefied at the 3.71 million tonne per annum Liquefied Natural Gas (LNG) plant. Prior to the construction and operation of the GEP the Bayu-Undan field was commonly referred to as the Bayu-Undan Gas Recycle Project.

ConocoPhillips Pipeline Australia Pty Ltd (COPPA) was the original operator of the pipeline, until the sale of the asset to Santos Limited, which started in 2019.

Description
There is a remotely-operated 28 inch subsea isolation valve (SSIV) close to the CPP. A transition flange denotes the change in diameter from 28 inch to 26 inch.

The pipeline lies directly on the seabed from Bayu-Undan to the entrance into Darwin Harbour. Within Darwin Harbour the pipeline is installed in a trench below seabed level and is further protected from dragged or dropped anchors by a protective rock berm. Water depth within the harbour is typically less than 10 m deep and this zone is predominantly intertidal. Most of the linepipe used during the construction was factory-coated with concrete-weight-coating in order to provide pipeline stabilisation, thus restricting lateral movement of the pipeline whilst minimising movement of seabed material.

Maintenance and repair
A significant number of free-spans develop under the pipeline due to subsea currents and movement of seabed material. As a result grout bags are regularly installed by ROV in an attempt to restore support and to minimise the occurrence of vortex-induced vibrations (VIV) along the pipeline.

The subsea pipeline is also subjected to in-line inspection (ILI) using a magnetic-flux leakage intelligent pig. The pig is launched from the Bayu-Undan CPP facility in the Timor Sea and is retrieved at the pig receiver at Darwin LNG after transiting through the 502 km pipeline. A by-product of the pigging operation is iron oxide dust (from the internal walls of the pipeline at the welded joints and margins), laced with radioactive NORM, and BTEX from the production wells and process at Bayu-Undan. The water used to clean the pigging contractor's pigs is also contaminated with NORM. This pigging waste is stored at the Darwin LNG facility in various forms, including a collection of IBC.

References

Natural gas pipelines in Australia
2006 establishments in Australia
Timor Sea
 
Economy of the Northern Territory